Wrigley is a group of neighborhoods in Long Beach, California. It includes the neighborhoods North Wrigley, South Wrigley, Southeast Wrigley and Wrigley Heights.  Its name derives from William Wrigley Jr., the owner and founder of the famed Wrigley Spearmint Gum Empire in Chicago. It was one of the first communities established in Long Beach. With the exception of Wrigley Heights, the area is developed throughout on a gridiron street pattern.

The district is bounded on the north by Interstate 405, on the south by Pacific Coast Highway, on the east by Long Beach Boulevard and on the west by the Los Angeles River. Pacific Avenue also goes through the area with commercial strip land uses. The Los Angeles River and the Interstate 710 make up the western boundary.

The neighborhood has a community park, Veterans Park, convenient access to local freeways, A Line light rail transportation and the new Wrigley Marketplace shopping district - an innovative joint venture between Long Beach and the Metropolitan Transportation Authority. The center combines neighborhood-serving retail with a modern park and ride facility for light rail commuters.

History

The original subdivision pattern was established in 1905. Homes on 48 lots were developed by William Wrigley's company between 1928 and 1934. These blocks of homes now form the Wrigley Landmark District.

In 1914, George Encinas purchased six and one-half acres of land from the Bixby family to establish the Encinas family ranch. The ranch house at 625 Baker Street was demolished in 1960 during the development of Interstate 405. The Baker Street Park was established in 2011 at the address of the former ranch house.

Homes in Wrigley Heights were developed by Lloyd Whaley.

A Pacific Electric track once ran along what is now the Daisy Avenue Greenbelt.

Architecture

See also
Neighborhoods of Long Beach, California

References

Neighborhoods in Long Beach, California